Arbi Khamkhoev (born 1 August 1993) is a Russian judoka.

He is the bronze medallist of the 2016 Judo Grand Prix Zagreb in the -73 kg category.

References

External links
 

1991 births
Living people
Russian male judoka
21st-century Russian people